Roman Rubinshteyn (born August 22, 1996) is a Belarusian-Israeli professional basketball player for Maccabi Haifa of the Israeli Basketball Premier League.

Early life
Rubinshteyn was born in Minsk, Belarus. He played for Tsmoki-Minsk youth team.

Professional career
In 2012, Rubinshteyn started his professional career with Tsmoki-Minsk II, the reserve team of Tsmoki-Minsk.

On August 30, 2016, Rubinshteyn signed with Zlatorog Laško of the Slovenian Premier A. Rubinshteyn helped Zlatorog reach the 2017 Slovenian League playoffs as the third seed, but they eventually lost to Rogaška in the Semifinals.

In July 2017, Rubinshteyn returned to Tsmoki-Minsk for the 2017–18 season. On December 16, 2017, Rubinshteyn recorded a career-high 29 points, shooting 19-for-20 from the free throw line, along with six rebounds and four assists in a 94–99 loss to Borisfen Mogilev. In 46 games played during the 2017–18 season, he averaged 11.3 points, 3.5 rebounds and 3 assists and 1.6 steals per game. Rubinshteyn won the 2018 Belarusian League and the 2018 Belarusian Cup titles with Tsmoki-Minsk.

On July 30, 2018, Rubinshteyn signed a one-year deal with Legia Warszawa of the Polish Basketball League. However, on February 15, 2019, Rubinshteyn parted ways with Legia to join Hapoel Be'er Sheva of the Israeli Premier League. On July 1, 2019, he parted ways with Be'er Sheva.

On August 22, 2019, Rubinshteyn signed with Hapoel Hevel Modi'in of the Israeli National League for the 2019–20 season.

On January 24, 2021, Rubinshteyn signed with Maccabi Haifa of the Israeli Basketball Premier League for the 2020–21 season.

National team career
Rubinshteyn is a member of the Belarus national basketball team. He was also a member of the Under-16, Under-18 and Under-20 Belarus national teams.

In July 2015, Rubinshteyn participated in the 2015 FIBA Europe Under-20 Championship Division B, where he averaged 12.4 points, 4.1 rebounds and 4.4 assists, leading the U-20 Belarusian team to the fifth place.

Personal life
Rubinshteyn also holds an Israeli passport.

References

External links
 FIBA profile
 Eurobasket profile
 RealGM profile

1996 births
Living people
BC Tsmoki-Minsk players
21st-century Belarusian Jews
Belarusian men's basketball players
Hapoel Be'er Sheva B.C. players
Hapoel Hevel Modi'in B.C. players
Legia Warsaw (basketball) players
Point guards
Shooting guards
Basketball players from Minsk